The City of Westminster, a central London borough, has 116 parks and open spaces; these include small gardens as well as larger areas of land. The open spaces are managed by Westminster City Council and private resident and business associations. Westminster is also home to four of the Royal Parks (Hyde Park,Green Park, St. James's Park and Kensington Gardens). The Royal Parks are managed by Royal Parks.

Westminster has a selection of typical London squares and formal gardens. Among the sites are:

Brown Hart Gardens
Cavendish Square Gardens
College Garden
Golden Square
Grosvenor Square, the site of the Canadian High Commission (former US Embassy) and the current US Embassy
Hanover Square
Leicester Square
Manchester Square
Mount Street Gardens
Paddington Recreation Ground
Pimlico Gardens
Regent's Park (Partly)
Victoria Embankment Gardens
Victoria Tower Gardens (managed By Royal Parks)

The only Local Nature Reserve in the borough is St. John's Wood Church Grounds. In addition to parks and open spaces within the borough, the City owns and maintains East Finchley Cemetery in the London Borough of Barnet.

External links
City of Westminster Parks and Recreation